Pseudodaphnella retellaria is a species of sea snail, a marine gastropod mollusk in the family Raphitomidae.

Description
The length of the shell attains 6 mm, its diameter 2.3 mm.

(Original description) The small shell is lanceolate, subturreted and thin. Its colour is dull white, with a few brown spots on the shoulder, and the apex brown. It contains 8 whorls, including a protoconch of 3½ whorls. 

The sculpture is harsher on the earlier whorls. The radials are narrow, almost lamellate, ending abruptly at the shoulder and gradually on the base, slightly oblique, fourteen widely spaced on the body whorl and on the penultimate sixteen. These are crossed by spiral threads of smaller gauge, forming long narrow meshes, amounting to sixteen on the body whorl and to six on the penultimate. The fasciole is flat, only incised by crescentic growth lines. The aperture is ovate. The outer lip forms a small varix, ascending the previous whorl and enclosing a C-shaped sinus. The outer lip is dentate at the margin and tuberculate within. The siphonal canal is short and wide.

Distribution
This marine species is endemic to Australia and occurs off Queensland; also off Papua New Guinea.

References

 Powell, A.W.B. 1966. The molluscan families Speightiidae and Turridae, an evaluation of the valid taxa, both Recent and fossil, with list of characteristic species. Bulletin of the Auckland Institute and Museum. Auckland, New Zealand 5: 1–184, pls 1–23
 Liu, J.Y. [Ruiyu] (ed.). (2008). Checklist of marine biota of China seas. China Science Press. 1267 pp.

External links
 
 Brazier, J. 1876. A list of the Pleurotomidae collected during the Chevert expedition, with the description of the new species. Proceedings of the Linnean Society of New South Wales 1: 151–162

retellaria
Gastropods described in 1922
Gastropods of Australia